The UAA College of Education is a college at the University of Alaska Anchorage.

The college  offers a bachelor's program in elementary education and master's programs in secondary education, music and physical education, and counseling.  Under the aegis of the Department of Educational Leadership, it is the only institution providing school-administrator training in the State of Alaska. 

As of 2019, the program is no longer accredited.

External links
University of Alaska Anchorage
 - official site

University of Alaska Anchorage
Education in Anchorage, Alaska